Elisabetta Visconti (1374 – 2 February 1432), also known as Elisabeth or Elizabeth, was a younger child of Bernabò Visconti and his wife, Beatrice Regina della Scala. Elisabetta was a member of the House of Visconti.

Family 
Elisabetta was born in Milan and was one of the youngest of fifteen siblings.

Elisabetta's sister, Taddea Visconti married Stephen III, Duke of Bavaria and was mother of Isabeau of Bavaria, wife of Charles VI of France. Isabeau was the mother of Charles VII of France, Catherine, Queen of England, Isabella, Queen of England and Michelle, Duchess of Valois.

Elisabetta's maternal grandparents were Mastino II della Scala and his wife Taddea da Carrara. Her paternal grandparents were Stefano Visconti and his wife Valentina Doria.

Elisabetta's father, Bernabò, was a cruel and ruthless despot, and an implacable enemy of the Church. He seized the papal city of Bologna, rejected the Pope and his authority, confiscated ecclesiastical property, and forbade any of his subjects to have any dealings with the Curia. He was excommunicated as a heretic in 1363 by Pope Urban V, who preached crusade against him. When Bernabò was in one of his frequent rages, only Beatrice Regina was able to approach him.

Marriage 
In 1380, Elisabetta was at first promised to Azzone, a son of Gian Galeazzo Visconti and his first wife Isabella of Valois. The marriage could not take place due to Azzone's premature death. After Isabella of Valois died, Caterina Visconti, Elisabetta's older sister, married his father Gian Galeazzo.

John II, Duke of Bavaria started marriage negotiations between his son, Ernest and Elisabetta.

The negotiations were successful. Elisabetta was married in Pfaffenhofen an der Ilm 26 January 1395 to Ernest. Two years later, on John's death, the couple became Duke and  Duchess of Bavaria-Munich. The couple had four children:
Albert III, Duke of Bavaria (23 March 1401, Munich–29 February 1460, Munich)
 Beatrix (c. 1403–12 March 1447, Neumarkt), married to:
 1424 in Ortenburg Count Hermann III of Cilli;
 1428 in Riedenburg Pfalzgraf Johann of Neuburg.
 Elisabeth (c. 1406–5 March 1468, Heidelberg), married to:
1430 in Mainz Duke Adolf of Jülich-Berg;
 1440 in Worms Count Hesso of Leiningen.
 Amalie (1408–1432), a nun in St. Klara's Cloister in Munich.

Before Elisabetta's death in 1432, her son Albert III married secretly the maid Agnes Bernauer; Ernest issued orders for her to be murdered. Agnes was accused of witchcraft and thrown into the River Danube and drowned. The civil war with his son finally ended with a reconciliation.

Elisabetta died 2 February 1432. She is buried with her husband in Munich.

Ancestry

References

Sources

1374 births
1432 deaths
Elisabetta
Elisabetta
House of Wittelsbach
14th-century Italian nobility
14th-century Italian women
15th-century Italian nobility
15th-century Italian women
Burials at Munich Frauenkirche